The activity theory, also known as the implicit theory of aging, normal theory of aging, and lay theory of aging, proposes that successful aging occurs when older adults stay active and maintain social interactions. It takes the view that the aging process is delayed and the quality of life is enhanced when old people remain socially active. 
The activity theory rose in opposing response to the disengagement theory. The activity theory and the disengagement theory were the two major theories that outlined successful aging in the early 1960s. The theory was developed by Robert J. Havighurst in 1961. In 1964, Bernice Neugarten asserted that satisfaction in old age depended on active maintenance of personal relationships and endeavors.

The theory assumes a positive relationship between activity and life satisfaction. One author suggests that activity enables older adults adjust to retirement and is named "the busy ethic".

The critics of the activity theory state that it overlooks inequalities in health and economics that hinders the ability for older people to engage in such activities. Also, some older adults do not desire to engage in new challenges. 

Activity theory reflects the functionalist perspective that the equilibrium that an individual develops in middle age should be maintained in later years. The theory predicts that older adults that face role loss will substitute former roles with other alternatives.

The activity theory is one of three major psychosocial theories which describe how people develop in old age. The other two psychosocial theories are the disengagement theory, with which the activity comes to odds, and the continuity theory which modifies and elaborates upon the activity theory.

Though in recent years the acceptance activity theory has diminished, it is still used as a standard to compare observed activity and life satisfaction patterns.

In social science research 
The activity theory has found its way into various qualitative and quantitative research settings, with social scientists exploring the impact of activity on aspects of the aging life.

Historically, activity participation among aging populations has been well explained in research, yet the interaction of determinants like personality and health are seldom included. One quantitative study aimed to fill this gap by analyzing the effects of extraverted personality on aging activity levels through addressing its interaction with physical and mental health. Through a series of telephone interviews in Hong Kong, China, a sample of 304 adults over the age of 50 were surveyed on perceived physical and mental health, level of extraversion, and level of activity. The associations between activity level and each variable were examined by comparing results with low, moderate, and high activity levels of extraverted individuals. Findings of this study reveal that there is a strong, positive correlation between extraversion and activity level, with participants indicating that a high activity level was most likely paired with the perception of good mental and physical health. 

Another study analyzed the aging population's ability to "describe a friend" by utilizing the theory of mind, which describes an individual's capacity to understand other people by ascribing mental states to them. This research aimed to investigate the relationship between activity level, older people's social relationships, and their associated theory of mind. 72 participants aged 60–79 from northern Italy were recruited to describe their best friend, with stories being transcribed and coded based on the level of detailed vocabulary used. This was followed with a questionnaire that examined the participants' activity level and cognitive functioning. Findings revealed that, although data was variable among the sample group, there was a slight positive correlation between high activity level, high affinity to social relationships, and ability to utilize theory of mind.

A different qualitative study aimed to investigate the impact of an intergenerational exchange between undergraduate students and nursing home residents on the social engagement and self-esteem of the elderly. 
13 older adult participants residing in an assisted living community in the rural Rocky Mountains were surveyed about their preferences of entertainment from childhood. From this survey, undergraduate researchers chose and viewed two movies with their paired participants. Nursing home residents were then interviewed about their level of enjoyment or disdain from the movie-viewing experience. Results of this study show a positive correlation among meaningful intergenerational exchanges, use of activity theory, and social engagement in the aging population. 

Overall, these research findings, among others, have provided important evidence for social scientists to inform policy making and service provision that supports active aging.

References

Gerontology
Theories of non-biological ageing